Richard M. Webster (April 29, 1922 – March 4, 1990) was an American politician from Missouri.  He attended the University of Missouri and worked as an attorney in Carthage, Missouri. He was elected to the Missouri House of Representatives, in 1948, 1950, and 1953 (special election). He served as Speaker of the House in 1954. He was elected to the Missouri State Senate in 1962 and was re-elected 6 times. He served in the Missouri Senate until his death in 1990.

Webster was married to the former Janet Poston Whitehead for 42 years. Their son, William L. Webster served as Missouri Attorney General. Their oldest son, Richard M. Webster, Jr. continues to live in Carthage, Missouri and served as the Jasper County Auditor.

References

External links

1922 births
1990 deaths
People from Carthage, Missouri
University of Missouri alumni
Missouri lawyers
Republican Party Missouri state senators
Speakers of the Missouri House of Representatives
Republican Party members of the Missouri House of Representatives
20th-century American politicians
20th-century American lawyers